Joseph Joshua Krakoski (born November 11, 1962) is a former American football linebacker in the National Football League (NFL) for the Washington Redskins.  He played college football at the University of Washington and was drafted in the sixth round of the 1985 NFL Draft by the Houston Oilers.  Krakoski attended Mission San Jose High School.

Children

Joe Krakoski has one daughter, Kaela, born in 1992.

See also
 Washington Huskies football statistical leaders

References

1962 births
Living people
Washington Huskies football players
American football linebackers
Washington Redskins players
Sportspeople from Aurora, Illinois
Players of American football from Illinois
American people of Slavic descent